Chikindzonot  Municipality (In the Yucatec Maya Language: “cenote in the west”) is one of the 106 municipalities in the Mexican state of Yucatán containing  (352.56 km2) of land and located roughly 170 km southeast of the city of Mérida.

History
It is unknown which chieftainship the area was under prior to the arrival of the Spanish. After the conquest the area became part of the encomienda system which lasted until the end of the colonial era. Yucatán declared its independence from the Spanish Crown in 1821 and in 1825, the area was assigned to the Valladolid region.

During the Caste War of Yucatán, the village was sacked by the rebel indigenous people and the 300 white inhabitants fled. Colonel Eulogio Rosado y Estevéz established a headquarters in 1848, 25 miles away in the town of Ichmul, to try to recover Chikindzonot. In 1849, Lt. Col. Pablo A. González y Osorio was able to retake the town, and thereafter it slowly repopulated.

It was designated as its own municipality in 1957.

Governance
The municipal president is elected for a three-year term. The town council has seven councilpersons, who serve as Secretary and councilors of public security, public sanitation and monuments.

Communities
The head of the municipality is Chikindzonot, Yucatán.  The other populated areas of the municipality include Chan-Chimilá, Chan Santa María e Ichmul; Chaxán, Ichmul, San Cristóbal, San José, Xarco, X-Campana, X-Kancabdzonot, Xkanteíl, Xoax Dzonot, Xpoxil, Yokdzonot Carrillo, and Yokdzonot Viejo. The significant populations are shown below:

Local festivals
Every year from the 1 to the 18 February the town holds a traditional village festival and in October, a celebration for its patron saint, St. Francis of Assisi.

Tourist attractions
 Church of San Antonio de Padua, built in the sixteenth century
 Church of La Purísima Concepción, built in the seventeenth century
 Chapel of San Pedro, built in the seventeenth century
 Cenote Chan Dzitnup
 Cenote Chikindzonot 
 Cenote El Cabo
 Cenote Naranja 
 Cenote Yaaxdzonot 
 Archaeological site Bolmay
 Archaeological site Palaban
 Archaeological site Petul 
 Archaeological site Poxil
 Archaeological site Sotpol
 Archaeological site Tamba
 Archaeological site Xalau
 Archaeological site Xcan
 Archaeological site Xcoom
 Archaeological site Xmaos
 Archaeological site Xuyap

References

Municipalities of Yucatán